Saatam Aatham is a 2022 Indian Gujarati thriller drama film written by Neeraj Pandey and directed by Shital Shah and produced by Hina Shah & Shaina Shah. It stars Shital Shah, Parikshit Tamaliya, and Denisha Ghumra. The film was released on 1 July 2022 under the banner of Friday Filmworks and Limelight Pictures. The film was reviewed positively by critics.

Plot
Munna, a contract killer, falls in love and becomes a reformed man by quitting his profession. But soon his life takes a turn.

Cast 
 Shital Shah as Chitra
 Parikshit Tamaliya as Munna 
 Denisha Ghumra as Vishakha
 Rajan Thakar as Dipak 
 Ankit Joshipura as Inspector Yadav 
 Rakesh Pujara as Salimbhai

Parth Oza performed cameos in "Gokul Avo Girdhari" song.

References

External links 
 

2022 films
2022 thriller drama films
2020s Gujarati-language films
Films shot in Gujarat
Indian thriller drama films